Hypercourt is a commune in the department of Somme, northern France. The municipality was established on 1 January 2017 by merger of the former communes of Pertain (the seat), Hyencourt-le-Grand and Omiécourt.

See also 
Communes of the Somme department

References 

Communes of Somme (department)
Communes nouvelles of Somme
Populated places established in 2017
2017 establishments in France